The following is the results of the Iran Super League 2012/13 basketball season, Persian Gulf Cup.

Regular season

Standings

Results

Playoffs

Quarterfinals 
Petrochimi vs. Al-Badr

Shahrdari Zanjan vs. Shahrdari Gorgan

Foolad Mahan vs. Sanaye Petrochimi

Mahram vs. Azad University

Semifinals 
Petrochimi vs. Shahrdari Gorgan

Foolad Mahan vs. Mahram

3rd place 
Shahrdari Gorgan vs. Foolad Mahan

Final 
Petrochimi vs. Mahram

References
 Asia Basket
 Iranian Basketball Federation

Iranian Basketball Super League seasons
League
Iran